"Can You See Me?" is a song recorded by Finnish singer Krista Siegfrids. The song was released on 30 September 2013 as the third and final single from her debut studio album Ding Dong! (2013). The song was written by Krista Siegfrids and Erik Nyholm. The song peaked at number 25 on the Finnish Download Chart and number 30 on the Finnish Airplay Chart.

Music video
A music video to accompany the release of "Can You See Me?" was first released onto YouTube on 30 September 2013 at a total length of three minutes and forty-nine seconds.

Track listing

Chart performance

Release history

References

2013 singles
2013 songs
Krista Siegfrids songs
Songs written by Krista Siegfrids